In enzymology, a NDP-glucose—starch glucosyltransferase is an enzyme that catalyzes the chemical reaction

NDP-glucose + (1,4-alpha-D-glucosyl)n  NDP + (1,4-alpha-D-glucosyl)n+1

Thus, the two substrates of this enzyme are NDP-glucose and (1,4-alpha-D-glucosyl)n, whereas its two products are NDP and (1,4-alpha-D-glucosyl)n+1.

This enzyme belongs to the family of glycosyltransferases, specifically the hexosyltransferases.  The systematic name of this enzyme class is NDP-glucose:1,4-alpha-D-glucan 4-alpha-D-glucosyltransferase. Other names in common use include granule-bound starch synthase, starch synthase II (ambiguous), waxy protein, starch granule-bound nucleoside diphosphate glucose-starch, glucosyltransferase, granule-bound starch synthase I, GBSSI, granule-bound starch synthase II, GBSSII, GBSS, and NDPglucose-starch glucosyltransferase.

References

 
 
 
 
 

EC 2.4.1
Enzymes of unknown structure